Sarah Fawcett is a South African oceanographer and climatologist. A senior lecturer in the Department of Oceanography at the University of Cape Town, she is particularly interested in the role of oceans in regulating biogeochemical cycles and how their dysregulation contributes to climate change. She was honoured in the World Economic Forum Young Scientists Class of 2020, and a P-Rating from the National Research Foundation, which recognizes that the scientist's work will likely have high impact.

Early life 
Fawcett was born in Benoni, Gauteng, and attended Benoni High School. She went on to study Earth and planetary science at Harvard University (2006) and completed a PhD at Princeton (2012) where she later held a postdoctoral fellowship (2012-2015).

Career 
In 2015, Fawcett was appointed a lecturer in oceanography at the University of Cape Town. She has worked to build up a diverse research group, aware of the discrimination still faced by female scientists. From 2016, she has participated in the SEAmester scheme that aims to train up postdoctoral oceanography researchers.

In her doctorate Fawcett investigated the relationship between nitrogen and populations of phytoplankton in upwelling ecosystems of the Sargasso Sea. She has continued to work on these relationships, concentrating on the subpolar North Atlantic and Southern Ocean as areas of particular importance. The sequestration of carbon through the biological pump in these regions may be an important regulatory of the global ocean system, but the dynamics of the nitrogen-phytoplankton system limit its efficiency. Much of Fawcett's works is based on measurements of stable nitrogen isotopes. Fawcett is also addressing the lack of research in the Benguela Upwelling System, which is important for the biodiversity and economy of the region. She is also primary investigator for the Antarctic Circumnavigation Expedition (ACE).

In 2017, she received the South African Network for Coastal and Oceanic Research (SANCOR) Young Researchers Award and the Claude Leon Merit Award for Early-Career Researchers. She was also distinguished as one of the Top 200 Young South Africans by the Mail and Guardian and received a NRF P-rating meaning her early career had suggested she would go on to become "a future international leader in [her] field". In 2018, the University of Cape Town awarded her its College of Fellows Young Researcher Award. In 2020, the World Economic Forum added Fawcett to its group of 25 young researchers at the "forefront of scientific discovery" for that year on account of her research on "ocean chemistry and biology in climate" and the "impacts of human activities on marine environments."

References 

South African women scientists
South African oceanographers
South African climatologists
University of Cape Town alumni
Princeton University alumni
Harvard University alumni
Year of birth missing (living people)
Living people